4th Corps or Cửu Long Corps (literally: Corps of Cửu Long or "Corps of the Mekong") is one of the four regular army corps of the People's Army of Vietnam. First organized in 1974 during the Vietnam War, 4th Corps had a major role in the Ho Chi Minh Campaign and the Cambodian–Vietnamese War. Today the corps is stationed in Dĩ An, Bình Dương.

 Commander: Maj. Gen. Nguyễn Hoàng
 Political Commissar: Maj. Gen. Nguyễn Trọng Nghĩa

History
In July 1973, the Central Committee of the Communist Party of Vietnam after its 21st conference issued a resolution of strengthening the armed forces in order to unify the country. In executing the issue, three months later the Ministry of Defence and the Military Commission of the Central Committee approved the plan of organizing regular army corps for the Vietnam People's Army. On July 20, 1974, General Võ Nguyên Giáp, Minister of Defence, signed the edict that led to the establishment of the 4th Corps in Đông Nam Bộ, where is located the part of Mekong River called Cửu Long River (Cửu Long Giang or Sông Cửu Long), from which came the name Cửu Long Corps of the unit.  The first headquarters of the corps consisted of party committee secretary (bí thư) Hoàng Thế Thiện and commander (tư lệnh) Hoàng Cầm.

During the Ho Chi Minh Campaign, it was 4th Corps that advanced through the delta regions of Phước Long, Biên Hòa and later captured the Special Capital Military District of Saigon and several important targets within Saigon. After the Vietnam War, 4th Corps continued to engage in the Cambodian–Vietnamese War, the corps was awarded the title Hero of the People's Armed Forces (Anh hùng Lực lượng vũ trang nhân dân) in 1980.

Organization

The command structure of 1st Corps consists of the High Command (Bộ tư lệnh), the Staff of 2nd Corps (Bộ tham mưu), the Political Department (Cục chính trị), the Department of Logistics (Cục hậu cần) and the Department of Technique (Cục kỹ thuật). The combat forces of the corps include:

Commanders

References

 

Corps of the People's Army of Vietnam
Military units and formations established in 1974
Hero of the People's Armed Forces